Cameron Forbes may refer to:

 William Cameron Forbes (1870–1959), American investment banker and diplomat
 Cameron Forbes (writer), Australian journalist and author